Mauro Milanese (born 17 September 1971) is an Italian former footballer and manager, who played as a left back. He has also been capped for the Italy national football team. He played 2 international games for Italy national first team and 200 matches at Serie A, 100 matches at Lega Pro Prima Divisione and two seasons playing in the Championship. In 2014, he was manager of Leyton Orient.

He is the current CEO (amministratore unico) of hometown club Triestina.

Playing career
Born in Trieste, Milanese started his senior career at Serie D side Monfalcone. He then played for Serie C1 side Massese, making 22 appearances before to join hometown club Triestina, where he played 50 Serie C1 matches in 2 seasons. In summer 1994 he was signed by Serie A side Cremonese, giving him the chance to make his top flight debut. He then played for Torino and Napoli, again at Serie A level. In summer 1997, he was signed by Parma, but in mid-season he was loaned to Internazionale. He played his first match for Inter on 25 January 1998, as a substitute for Youri Djorkaeff in a 1–1 draw to Empoli; he also remained at Inter the following season.

In summer 1999, he joined Perugia in co-ownership deal. In summer 2003, he left for Serie A newcomers Ancona but suffered his second relegation (the first being while at Torino). He then re-joined Serie B side Perugia.

In August 2005, he joined Queens Park Rangers in 1-year deal. Which he changed to play as a centre defender. He played 26 league matches but missed a month in September. His contract was later extended and released in May 2007. In August 2007 he was signed by Salernitana and won Serie C1 champion. He then left for Lega Pro Seconda Divisione side Varese Milanese planned to retire in July 2009 and aimed to qualify as a FIFA licensed football agent.

Post-playing career
On 16 June 2011, he was announced as new director of football of Serie B club Varese, days after predecessor Sean Sogliano accepted an offer from Serie A club Palermo.

On 1 August 2014, Milanese was announced as the new sporting director of English League One club Leyton Orient, following the takeover by Francesco Becchetti. On 26 October 2014, Milanese replaced interim manager Kevin Nugent as manager of Leyton Orient, however he was sacked just six weeks later on 8 December.

In 2016, after having invested 100,000 EUR of his own money to save the club from bankruptcy, Milanese directly took part in the acquisition of Triestina as part of an Australian consortium led by Metricon owner Mario Biasin, being subsequently named the club's CEO. Under his tenure, Triestina, then in Serie D, were successfully readmitted to Serie C in 2017 to fill a vacancy.

Honours

Player
Salernitana
Lega Pro Prima Divisione: 2008

Varese
Lega Pro Seconda Divisione: 2009

References

External links

 
 Inter Archive

1971 births
Living people
Italian footballers
Italian expatriate footballers
Serie A players
Serie B players
English Football League players
U.S. Triestina Calcio 1918 players
U.S. Cremonese players
Torino F.C. players
S.S.C. Napoli players
Parma Calcio 1913 players
Inter Milan players
A.C. Perugia Calcio players
A.C. Ancona players
Queens Park Rangers F.C. players
U.S. Salernitana 1919 players
S.S.D. Varese Calcio players
Association football fullbacks
Expatriate footballers in England
Expatriate football managers in England
Italian expatriate football managers
Italian expatriate sportspeople in England
Footballers from Trieste
Leyton Orient F.C. managers
English Football League managers
Italian football managers